Sorbus oligodonta, the kite-leaf rowan, is a species of rowan native to northern Yunnan, southeastern Tibet, and western Sichuan in China as well as to Myanmar.

It is a small to medium-sized deciduous tree growing to 5–15 m tall, with a rounded crown and dark grey bark, and slender shoots. The leaves are green to slightly glaucous-green above, paler beneath, 10–18 cm long, pinnate with 9-17 oval leaflets 3–4.5 cm long and 1–2 cm broad, broadest near the apex (hence the English name 'kite-leaf'), rounded at the end with a short acuminate apex, and very finely serrated margins; the basal leaflets are smaller than the apical leaflets. They change to a dark orange-red in late autumn, later than most other rowan species. The flowers are 8 mm diameter, with five yellowish-white petals and 20 yellowish-white stamens; they are produced in corymbs 6–12 cm diameter in late spring to early summer. The fruit is a pome 7–8 mm diameter, pale to deep pink with a persistent dark carpel, maturing in late autumn; the fruit stalks are distinctively red. The fruit commonly persist long into the winter after leaf fall; after being softened by frost they are readily eaten by thrushes and waxwings, which disperse the seeds.

It is closely related to Sorbus glabrescens, which differs in having more strongly glaucous blue-green leaves with the leaflets broadest near the middle and all about the same size, and white fruit. The two are sometimes treated as conspecific. Both are tetraploid species which breed true without pollination by apomixis.

Cultivation and uses
Outside of its native range, it is grown as an ornamental tree for its decorative pale pink fruit in western Europe. Selected cultivars include 'Pink Pagoda' and 'November Pink'. In the past, plants in cultivation were commonly misidentified as, or treated as synonyms of, Sorbus hupehensis, a species from further north in China (Hubei) that may be distinguished by its slender shoots and white fruit; it is much less common in cultivation.

References

oligodonta
Trees of China
Trees of Myanmar